Boumediene, Boumeddiene, Boumeddienne, Boumedienne, Boumedien, Boumeddien, or Boummedienne is an Arab surname. It can refer to:

People
 Abu Madyan (c. 1126 – 1198), also known as "Bou Medine" or "Boumediene",  Andalusian mystic and Sufi master
 Houari Boumediène (1932–1978, the President of Algeria from 1967 to 1978
 Lakhdar Boumediene (born 1966), Bosnian prisoner held in the Guantanamo Bay detention camp; plaintiff in Boumediene v. Bush
 Josef Boumedienne (born 1978), Swedish professional hockey player
 Hayat Boumeddiene (born 1988), fugitive common law wife of Amedy Coulibaly, who perpetrated the Montrouge shooting that was part of the terrorist attacks in France in 2015.
 Yahya Boumediene (born 1990), Belgian footballer

Other

 Boumediene v. Bush – 2008 United States Supreme Court decision involving a habeas motion by Lakhdar Boumediene
 Houari Boumediene Airport – airport serving Algiers, the capital of Algeria
 Sidi Boumedienne – municipality in northwest Algeria